This is a list of exoplanets discovered in 2017.

For exoplanets detected only by radial velocity, the mass value is actually a lower limit. (See Minimum mass for more information)

Specific exoplanet lists

References

2017

exoplanets